Barsham may refer to:

Baalshamin
Barsham, Norfolk, England
Barsham, Suffolk, England